Lee Chambers (born 22 May 1985) is a British  businessman and radio host. Chambers has been interviewed by Vogue, The Guardian, and Newsweek, and is known for analyzing the psychological aspects of color and workplaces. He was born in Bolton, United Kingdom, and is the founder of PhenomGames and Essentialise Workplace Wellbeing.

Early life
Chambers was born and raised in Bolton, Greater Manchester. He has credited his father Delroy Chambers, a civil servant, and his mother Susan Chambers, a nanny, for his work ethic and academic achievement. He is the oldest of three brothers, and the first in his family to attend university.

Education
Chambers earned a BSc in international business psychology and an MSc in environmental psychology from the University of Surrey.

Career

PhenomGames
After being made redundant from a corporate finance graduate scheme at the Co-operative Bank, Chambers founded the video game company PhenomGames in 2008. Initially trading from his parents' house, the business expanded into Europe. In 2014, while leading PhenomGames, Chambers immune system failed, leaving him immobile and having to learn to walk again. The company was sold to a Danish conglomerate in 2020.

Essentialise Workplace Wellbeing
Chambers is the founder of Essentialise Workplace Wellbeing, a company that provides mental wellbeing initiatives to other organizations. Chambers founded the business due to his own health challenges, and market opportunity for data-driven wellbeing. For his work with Essentialise, Chambers was called a Rising Star at the Hive Business Awards, and received a Great British Entrepreneur Award in 2021.

Other work
Chambers is part of the Oppo Color Counsel, alongside actress Amy Jackson. He has worked as a performance coach for sports clubs, including Manchester City F.C. and Everton F.C. In 2021, Chambers fronted a campaign for Charles Tyrwhitt, modelling for the launch of their Business of Life collection.

Chambers is the host of the Self Aware Entrepreneur Show and was voted in the Top 50 BAME Entrepreneurs Under 50 in 2020 alongside Nitin Passi, Eric Yuan and Rangan Chatterjee. He has also been recognized by Startups.co.uk. Chambers is a  contributor to discussions in the media regarding mental health and wellbeing and has appeared on the BBC, ITV and Channel 5.

Awards
 Top 50 BAME Entrepreneur Under 50 of 2020.
 UK Enterprise Awards Organisational Psychologist of the Year 2021.
 Ernst & Young Entrepreneur of the Year Award - Emerging Entrepreneur North (2011)
 Great British Entrepreneur Award - Service Industries (2021)

Radio
Chambers life story was the subject of a BBC Radio 4 programme presented by Matthew Syed broadcast 22 November 2021, named: Sideways 19. Is This What Success Looks Like?

Personal life
Chambers has a son, Myles, and a daughter, Annabel. They live in the Ribble Valley.

References

Living people
British psychologists
Alumni of the University of Surrey
1985 births
Alumni of Manchester Metropolitan University
Academics of Lancaster University
People from Bolton
Positive psychologists
21st-century British psychologists
Black British people in health professions
British company founders
21st-century English businesspeople
Black British businesspeople